Tregalizumab is an immunomodulator. It is also known as BT-061. Tregalizumab binds to domain 2 of CD4, and activates Regulatory T cells (Tregs).

References 

Monoclonal antibodies